The 1979 World Figure Skating Championships were held in Vienna, Austria from March 13 to 18. At the event, sanctioned by the International Skating Union, medals were awarded in men's singles, ladies' singles, pair skating, and ice dance.

The ISU Representative was John R. Shoemaker and the ISU Technical Delegate was Josef Dědič.

Medal tables

Medalists

Medals by country

Results

Men

Referee:
 Sonia Bianchetti 

Assistant Referee:
 Benjamin T. Wright 

Judges:
 Eva von Gamm 
 Margaret Berezowski 
 Toshio Suzuki 
 Monique Georgelin 
 Yvonne Tutt 
 Walburga Grimm 
 Tatiana Danilenko 
 Pamela Davis 
 Tjasa Andrée 
 Václav Skála

Ladies
*: better placed due to the majority of the better placings

Referee:
 Hermann Schiechtl 

Assistant Referee:
 Martin Felsenreich 

Judges:
 Eugen Romminger 
 Berit Aarens 
 Evgenia Bogdanova 
 Lena Vainio 
 Jürg Wilhelm 
 Giordano Abbondati 
 Ingrid Linke 
 Jacqueline Kendall-Baker 
 Charles Foster 
 Suzanne Francis

Pairs

Referee:
 Elemér Terták 

Assistant Referee:
 Emil Skákala 

Judges:
 Thérèse Maisel 
 Liudmila Kubashevskaya 
 Jacqueline Kendall-Baker 
 Günter Teichmann 
 Mary Louise Wright 
 Willi Wernz 
 Oskar Urban 
 Junko Hiramatsu 
 Suzanne Fancis 
 Pamela Davis 
 Giordano Abbondati

Ice dance
* better placed due to the majority of the better placings

Referee:
 Hans Kutschera 

Assistant Referee:
 Lawrence Demmy 

Judges:
 Igor Kabanov 
 Brenda Long 
 Pál Vásárhelyi 
 Gerhard Frey 
 Lysiane Lauret 
 Virginia Le Fevre 
 Dennis McFarlane 
 Rudolf Zorn 
 Gerhardt Bubnik 
 Tsukasa Kimura

Sources
 Result list provided by the ISU

World Figure Skating Championships
World Figure Skating Championships
World Figure Skating Championships
International figure skating competitions hosted by Austria
Sports competitions in Vienna
World Figure Skating Championships
1970s in Vienna